Happy Accidents (1990) is the third album by Montreal pop-punk band Doughboys.

Overview 

Happy Accidents was released on Restless Records and was produced by Michael Phillip Wojewoda and engineered by David Sutton.

Happy Accidents was the band’s first full release to feature drummer Paul Newman.

Track listing

Personnel 

 Vocals, Guitar - John Kastner, Jonathan Cummins
 Bass, Vocals - Jon Bondhead
 Drums - Paul Newman
 Engineer - Bryce Goggin
 Mastered By - David Sutton 
 Mixed By - Ormond Jobin  
 Producer - Michael Phillip Wojewoda 
Artwork By - Drazen Kozjan

References

External links 
 "Happy Accidents" on Allmusic 

1990 albums
Doughboys (Canadian band) albums
Restless Records albums